Gyula Dobay (18 November 1937 – 11 June 2007) was a freestyle swimmer from Hungary. He competed at the 1956, 1960 and 1964 Olympics in eight events in total with the best result of fifth place in the 100 m freestyle in 1960. At the European Championships he won two bronze medals, both in 1958.

After the 1956 Olympics, Dobay defected to the United States due to the Soviet invasion of Hungary. He stayed there for 16 months, but failed to find a stable job and returned to Hungary. After retiring from swimming he ran a sports shop in Budapest.

References

1937 births
2007 deaths
Hungarian male swimmers
Olympic swimmers of Hungary
Hungarian male freestyle swimmers
Swimmers at the 1956 Summer Olympics
Swimmers at the 1960 Summer Olympics
Swimmers at the 1964 Summer Olympics
Sportspeople from Szeged
European Aquatics Championships medalists in swimming
Universiade medalists in swimming
Universiade bronze medalists for Hungary
20th-century Hungarian people
21st-century Hungarian people